Princess Ida Caroline of Saxe-Meiningen (25 June 1794 – 4 April 1852), was a German princess, a member of the House of Wettin, and by marriage Princess of Saxe-Weimar-Eisenach.

Biography
Ida was born on 13 August 1794 at Meiningen, Thuringia, Germany. Her father was George I, Duke of Saxe-Meiningen; and her mother was Luise Eleonore, daughter of Prince Christian of Hohenlohe-Langenburg. She was titled Princess Ida of Saxe-Meiningen, Duchess in Saxony with the style Serene Highness from her birth until the Congress of Vienna (1814–15), when the entire House of Wettin was raised to the style of Highness. Her siblings were Adelaide (who became Queen Consort of the United Kingdom and of Hanover as wife of King William IV of the United Kingdom) and Bernhard II, Duke of Saxe-Meiningen, with whom she maintained a close relationship.

In Meiningen on 30 May 1816 she married Prince Bernhard of Saxe-Weimar-Eisenach, who served as a General in the Netherlands and she followed him in his various garrison cities during the following years; however, during the summer she lived in Liebenstein and Altenstein Palace, where she also remained when her husband made his North American tour. In 1830 she and her children participated in the coronation of her sister and brother-in-law in London, and from 1836 she moved to Liebenstein as her permanent summer residence. Thanks to her charitable activities, Ida was very popular among the population.

On 22 June 1850 she was one of the godparents of Prince Arthur, Duke of Connaught and Strathearn, third son of Queen Victoria and Prince Albert; however, because was unable to be physically present, she was represented by the Duchess of Kent, mother of the Queen.

Ida died of pneumonia in Weimar on 4 April 1852 aged 57. Her last words were: "I hope that this night would sleep well". She was buried in the Weimarer Fürstengruft. Two years later, in 1854, her brother Bernhard II erected the called Ida monument at the now ruined Burg Liebenstein. In 2004 the monument was extensively renovated.

Issue
Princess Louise Wilhelmine Adelaide (31 March 1817 – 11 July 1832).
Prince William Charles (25 June 1819 – 22 May 1839).
Princess Amalie Auguste Cecilia (30 May 1822 – 16 June 1822)
Prince William Augustus Edward (11 October 1823 – 16 November 1902), who entered the British army, served with much distinction in the Crimean War, became colonel of the 1st Life Guards, and later a British Field Marshal; married Lady Augusta Gordon-Lennox. No issue.
Prince Hermann Bernhard Georg (4 August 1825 – 31 August 1901), married Princess Auguste of Württemberg; one of his daughters, Pauline married Charles Augustus, Hereditary Grand Duke of Saxe-Weimar-Eisenach.
Prince Frederick Gustav Charles (28 June 1827 – 6 January 1892), married Pierina Marocchia nobile di Marcaini, created Baroness of Neuperg (23 May 1872). No issue.
Princess Anna Amalie Maria (9 September 1828 – 14 July 1864).
Princess Amalie Maria da Gloria Auguste (20 May 1830 – 1 May 1872), who married Prince Henry of the Netherlands.  No issue.

Ancestry

References

External links
Descendants of Hans den Yngre af Sønderborg – Ninth Generation: Bernhard Carl von Sachsen-Weimar-Eisenach

1794 births
1852 deaths
House of Saxe-Meiningen
People from Meiningen
Princesses of Saxe-Meiningen
Princesses of Saxe-Weimar-Eisenach
Deaths from pneumonia in Germany
Daughters of monarchs